Allonemobius is a genus of cricket, insects in the family Gryllidae. They are part of the subfamily Nemobiinae, also known as "ground crickets."

Taxonomy
The Orthoptera Species File database lists the following species:
Allonemobius allardi  (Alexander & Thomas, 1959)
Allonemobius fasciatus  (De Geer, 1773)
Allonemobius fultoni  Howard & Furth, 1986
Allonemobius griseus  (Walker, 1904)
Allonemobius maculatus  (Blatchley, 1900)
Allonemobius shalontaki  Braswell, Birge & Howard, 2006
Allonemobius socius  (Scudder, 1877)
Allonemobius sparsalsus  (Fulton, 1930)
Allonemobius tinnulus  (Fulton, 1931)
Allonemobius walkeri  Howard & Furth, 1986

References

Ground crickets